Maryam Garba (born 7 August 1995) is a handball goalkeeper from France who plays for Paris 92. Her team placed second at the 2012/13 Cup Winners' Cup and 2013/14 Challenge Cup.

References

1995 births
Living people
French female handball players
Handball players from Paris